Mastogenius is a genus of beetles in the family Buprestidae, containing the following species:

 Mastogenius aeneus Kerremans, 1897
 Mastogenius aliciae Westcott, 2005
 Mastogenius arizonicus Bellamy, 2002
 Mastogenius barrigai Moore, 1994
 Mastogenius castlei Champlain & Knull, 1922
 Mastogenius cedralensis Manley, 1987
 Mastogenius changonensis Manley, 1986
 Mastogenius coyolensis Manley, 1987
 Mastogenius crenulatus Knull, 1934
 Mastogenius cuneaticollis Van Dyke, 1953
 Mastogenius cyanelytron Westcott, 2008
 Mastogenius cyaneous Fisher, 1922
 Mastogenius elinarae Manley, 1986
 Mastogenius eruleus Obenberger, 1939
 Mastogenius galapagoensis Van Dyke, 1953
 Mastogenius guayasensis Manley, 1986
 Mastogenius guayllabambensis MacRae, 2003
 Mastogenius howdenorum Manley, 1990
 Mastogenius impressipennis Fall, 1906
 Mastogenius insperatus Kurosawa, 1972
 Mastogenius jipijapa Manley, 1986
 Mastogenius laevifrons Germain & Kerremans, 1906
 Mastogenius lizaleriae Moore, 1998
 Mastogenius manglaraltoensis Manley, 1986
 Mastogenius martinezi Cobos, 1956
 Mastogenius pacacua Manley, 1987
 Mastogenius parallelus Solier, 1849
 Mastogenius peruvianus Fisher, 1949
 Mastogenius primaevus Obenberger, 1957
 Mastogenius proximus Cobos, 1981
 Mastogenius puncticollis Schaeffer, 1919
 Mastogenius relictus Bílý, 1979
 Mastogenius reticulicollis Cobos, 1981
 Mastogenius robustus Schaeffer, 1905
 Mastogenius simulans Cobos, 1981
 Mastogenius solieri Thomson, 1878
 Mastogenius subcyaneus (LeConte, 1860)
 Mastogenius sulcicollis Philippi in Philippi & Philippi, 1864
 Mastogenius taoi (Tôyama, 1983)
 Mastogenius testaceipes Obenberger, 1941
 Mastogenius texanus Bellamy, 2002

References

Buprestidae genera